Samborzec  is a village in Sandomierz County, Świętokrzyskie Voivodeship, in south-central Poland. It is the seat of the gmina (administrative district) called Gmina Samborzec.

The village has a population of 500.

References

Samborzec
Radom Governorate
Kielce Voivodeship (1919–1939)